Edmund Kingston (born 9 September 1981) is a Liberian football midfielder.

He played with St. John's Red Storm and Brooklyn Knights in the United States, NK Zagreb in Croatia, Selangor FA and ATM FA in Malaysia, and Village United F.C. in Jamaica. He now helps with the development of young players

He made 2 appearances for the Liberian national team in 2001.

References

1981 births
Living people
Liberian footballers
Liberia international footballers
Liberian expatriate footballers
Liberian expatriate sportspeople in Malaysia
Association football midfielders
Brooklyn Knights players
Expatriate soccer players in the United States
NK Zagreb players
Expatriate footballers in Croatia
Expatriate footballers in Malaysia
Village United F.C. players
Expatriate footballers in Jamaica